Manjusri Secondary School (MJR) is a co-educational government-aided secondary school in Ubi, Singapore. Named after the bodhisattva Manjusri, it was established by the Singapore Buddhist Federation in 1982 and affiliated to two primary schools: Mee Toh School and Maha Bodhi School.

School history
The school was set up by the Singapore Buddhist Federation in 1982 at 149 Sims Drive, Singapore 387380. In 2009, the school moved to a new campus at 20 Ubi Avenue 1 which was officially opened on 22 April 2010. The move allowed the school to share resources with its affiliated primary school, Maha Bodhi School. James Cook University Singapore currently occupies the old campus and continues to use its buildings.

The school celebrated its 30th anniversary in 2012. The annual school anniversary concert was held in April 2012 at the LASALLE College of the Arts in conjunction of the school's 30th anniversary. In November, the school organised a homecoming dinner for past-and-present staff and students, with Education Minister Heng Swee Keat being the guest-of-honour.

Notable alumni
 Goh Qiu Bin: Gold medalist (Wushu), 2005 Southeast Asian Games
 Ho Wee San: Executive Director of Singapore Chinese Orchestra, Nominated Member of Parliament
 Tan Yan Ni: Bronze medalist (Wushu), 2014 Asian Games 
 Ya Hui: Actress, Mediacorp
 Koh Min Hui: Musician, Singapore Chinese Orchestra

References

External links

Secondary schools in Singapore
Educational institutions established in 1982
1982 establishments in Singapore
Schools in Central Region, Singapore